Younghoe Koo (pronounced ; born August 3, 1994) is a South Korean American football player who is a placekicker for the Atlanta Falcons of the National Football League (NFL). He was named to the Pro Bowl in 2020. 

Koo played college football for the Georgia Southern Eagles. He signed with the Los Angeles Chargers as an undrafted free agent in 2017, but was released a month into season after missing consecutive game-ending kicks.  Following a year away from football, Koo played for the Atlanta Legends of the Alliance of American Football (AAF), where he converted all of his field goal attempts until the AAF suspended operations. His success led to his return to the NFL the same year with the Falcons. Koo is known for his ability to successfully execute onside kicks, and Koo has the second-highest Field Goal percentage.

Early life
Koo was born in Seoul, South Korea, on August 3, 1994. He played soccer growing up and won a regional kicking competition. He attended sixth grade in the United States after moving to New Jersey to live with his mother, who had gone to the country two years earlier to become a nurse while Koo's father remained in Seoul as a university professor.
 
Koo played on the football team for Ridgewood High School in Ridgewood, New Jersey. He was named team MVP his senior season, contributing on both special teams and defense, where he tallied six interceptions.

College career 
At Georgia Southern University, Koo was a four-year contributor for the Eagles, earning first-team all-conference honors in the Sun Belt Conference in his final season, during which he converted 19 of 20 field goal attempts. He was also named a finalist for the Lou Groza Award, given annually to the best college kicker in the nation. At the conclusion of his college career, Koo ultimately converted 88.6% of his field goal attempts, a Georgia Southern team record.

Professional career

Los Angeles Chargers

2017 season 
Koo signed with the Los Angeles Chargers as an undrafted free agent following the 2017 NFL Draft. He won the starting job over incumbent kicker Josh Lambo following the conclusion of the preseason. Koo became the fourth player in NFL history to have been born in South Korea.

In the 2017 season opener on the road against the Denver Broncos, Koo's game-tying 44-yard field goal attempt in the final seconds of the game was blocked by the Broncos' Shelby Harris, and the Chargers lost 24–21. The kick had little chance of succeeding after Denver overwhelmed the Chargers' line on the play. An earlier attempt by Koo was successful, but it was called off after the Broncos had called a timeout right before the snap. The following week, Koo missed a game-winning 44-yard attempt in a 19–17 loss to the Miami Dolphins.

The following two weeks, Koo converted both of his field goal attempts and all four of his extra points. However, the 0–4 Chargers waived him after Week 4, replacing him with 10-year veteran Nick Novak. Chargers head coach Anthony Lynn stated that he wanted "someone with a little more consistency and experience" than Koo. Lynn added that, "I think Koo is going to have a long NFL career ... A lot of rookies get cut early in their career, and they come back and play for a lot of years." "Koo's a very talented kicker," Novak said. "He's got a live leg and a lot of talent." Overall with the Chargers, Koo was 3-of-6 on field goals and recorded 8 touchbacks on 14 kickoffs. Frank Schwab of Yahoo Sports wrote that the winless Chargers were "using [Koo] as a scapegoat."

Atlanta Legends
On January 14, 2019, Koo signed with the Atlanta Legends of the AAF. On February 9, he scored the first points in AAF regular season history, making a 38-yard field goal against the Orlando Apollos. After the Legends started the 2019 AAF season 0–3, on March 3, Koo kicked two field goals, including the 33-yard game winner, against the Arizona Hotshots to seal the 14–11 Atlanta win. The following week against the Memphis Express, he made all three of his attempts, including the game-winning 35-yard field goal with nine seconds remaining to secure a 23–20 victory, and was eventually named AAF Special Teams Player of the Week. The league ceased operations during midseason in April 2019. For the year, Koo had been a perfect 14-of-14 on his field goals.

New England Patriots
Following the suspension of the AAF, Koo worked out with the Chicago Bears, who were in need of a kicker after releasing Cody Parkey, but did not end up signing with the team. After longtime kicker Stephen Gostkowski was placed on injured reserve, the New England Patriots signed Koo to their practice squad on October 4, 2019. On October 15, 2019, Koo was released.

Atlanta Falcons

2019 season 

On October 29, 2019, Koo was signed by the Atlanta Falcons after they cut their longtime kicker and franchise leading scorer, Matt Bryant. In his Falcons debut, Koo made all four of his field goals (including a 48-yarder) and both of his extra points in a 26–9 upset win over the New Orleans Saints.
He was named the NFC Special Teams Player of the Week for his performance. In Week 13 against the New Orleans Saints on Thanksgiving Day, Koo delivered three successful onside kicks, one of which was undone by a penalty, in the 26–18 loss. In Week 14 against the Carolina Panthers, Koo made four field goals (including a then career-long 50-yarder), four extra points, and recovered a fumble forced by teammate Damontae Kazee on wide receiver Greg Dortch during a kickoff return in the 40–20 win. For this performance, he was named the NFC Special Teams Player of the Week for the second time.

2020 season 
On February 18, 2020, Koo signed a one-year contract extension with the Falcons. In Week 2 against the Dallas Cowboys, Koo made all four of his field goal attempts, and all three of his extra points in the 39–40 loss. In Week 5 against the Carolina Panthers, Koo made both of his field goal attempts (including a career-long 54-yarder), in the 16-23 loss. In Week 6 against the Minnesota Vikings, Koo went 4-for-4 on field goals, as well as 4-for-4 on extra points, in the 40–23 win. In Week 8 against the Carolina Panthers, Koo made all four of his field goal attempts in the 25–17 win. In Week 12 against the Las Vegas Raiders, Koo made a career-high 5 field goals in the 43–6 blowout win. For his efforts in the month of November, Koo was named NFC Special Teams Player of the Month. Koo became the NFL's leading scorer following Week 13, having made 32 of 33 field goals and 23 extra points for a total of 119 points. In Week 16 against the Kansas City Chiefs, Koo missed a game-tying 39-yard field goal in the 14–17 loss after the ball was tipped by the Chiefs' Tanoh Kpassagnon.

On December 20, 2020, Koo was selected to his first Pro Bowl. He signed a contract extension with the Falcons on March 11, 2021.

2021 season 
In Week 3, Koo made a game winning 40-yard field goal as time expired to defeat the New York Giants 17–14. Koo made another game-winning field goal in Week 7 against the Miami Dolphins to give the Falcons a 30–28 win as time expired. Koo made his third game-ending field goal of the season in a 27–25 Week 9 road win over the New Orleans Saints.

2022 season
On March 15, 2022, Koo signed a five-year, $24.25 million contract extension with the Falcons. In Week 8 against the Carolina Panthers, Koo made a game winning 41-yard field goal to give the Falcons a 37–34 overtime win. In Week 17 against the Arizona Cardinals, Koo made another game-winning field goal to give the Falcons a 20–19 win as time expired. Koo went 12/12 on field goals and 7/7 on extra points in the months of December and January. For his efforts, he was named NFC Special Teams Player Of The Month.

NFL career statistics

Regular season

Notes

References

External links
Atlanta Falcons bio
Georgia Southern Eagles bio

1994 births
American football placekickers
American sportspeople of Korean descent
Atlanta Falcons players
Atlanta Legends players
Georgia Southern Eagles football players
Living people
Los Angeles Chargers players
New England Patriots players
People from Ridgewood, New Jersey
Players of American football from New Jersey
Ridgewood High School (New Jersey) alumni
South Korean emigrants to the United States
South Korean players of American football
Sportspeople from Bergen County, New Jersey
Sportspeople from Seoul
National Conference Pro Bowl players